Ustad Aman Ali Khan ‘Amar’ (1888–1953) was an Indian classical vocalist and composer from the Bhendibazaar Gharana. He brought many Carnatic ragas into Hindustani classical music.

Aman Ali was the son of Chhajju Khan, one of the founders of the Bhendibazaar Gharana, who came from Uttar Pradesh and settled in the Bhendibazaar area of Bombay. Aman Ali learned Carnatic music under the guidance of Kalanidhi Bidaram Krishnappa, court musician of Mysore state. He introduced rhythmic play (layakari) and style of solfa singing (sargam) to the Bhendibazaar gharana. Aman Ali's music was especially noted for its rhythmic sargam patterns, for which he derived inspiration from Carnatic music. The great vocalist Amir Khan considered Aman Ali to be a major musical influence in his life.

Aman Ali left Bombay in 1947 and settled in Pune. He contracted pneumonia while visiting Delhi for concerts and died on February 11, 1953.

His style influenced Amir Khan and Vasantrao Deshpande. His disciples include Shivkumar Shukla, T. D. Janorikar, Muhammed Hussain Khan, playback singers Manna Dey and Lata Mangeshkar, music director Nisar Bazmi, Wali Ahmed Khan, B. Chaitanya Dev and harmonium player Shantilal.

References

1888 births
1953 deaths
Hindustani singers
20th-century Indian male classical singers